William J. Sowerby (born September 16, 1956) is an American politician from Michigan. Sowerby is a Democratic member of Michigan House of Representatives from District 31.

Early life 
On September 16, 1956, Sowerby was born. Sowerby grew up in St. Clair Shores, Michigan.

Education 
In 1978, Sowerby earned a BA degree from Wayne State University.

Career 
Sowerby was an automotive sales representative.

On November 8, 2016, Sowerby won the election and became a Democratic member of the Michigan House of Representatives. Sowerby defeated Lisa Valerio-Nowc and Mike Saliba with 56.16% of the votes. On November 6, 2018, as an incumbent, Sowerby won the election and continued serving District 31. Sowerby defeated Lisa Valerio-Nowc by 59.89% of the votes.

Personal life 
Sowerby's wife is Martha. He has a son from a previous marriage.

References

External links 
 William Sowerby at ballotpedia.org

Living people
1956 births
Wayne State University alumni
Democratic Party members of the Michigan House of Representatives
21st-century American politicians